Anne Marie Nouel de Tourville de Buzonnière, who wrote as Anne de Tourville (26 August 1910 – September 2004), was a 20th-century French woman of letters.

Biography 
The daughter of Jean de Tourville and his wife Marie née Lesage de la Haye, she was born in the village of Bais, Ille-et-Vilaine, and spent her childhood in Morieux, then at Saint-Servan. Around 1966, she settled in Dinard, which she did not leave until the late 1990s to return to her native village. She lived there peacefully until her death in September 2004 in Vitré in the home of the children of friends who had helped her and her family during the Second World War.

Her novels, with rural settings such as "Jabadao", which earned her the Prix Femina, or maritime settings such as "Matelot Gaël", are set in a Brittany half real and half imagined.

Writing was not her only talent: she exhibited her miniature paintings at the Salon des artistes français.

Works 
1944: Les gens de par ici, Prix interallié de Bretagne
1951: Jabadao, éditions Delamain et Boutelleau, Prix Femina
1953: Matelot Gaël
1958: Femmes de la mer

Bibliography 
 Anne de Tourville, ou le magique sillage de son rêve, Le Pays de Dinan. Patrick Delon. Tome XIV. Bibliothèque municipale. Dinan. 1994. 
 La Mort en Bretagne chez Pierre Loti et Anne de Tourville, Mémoires de la  CXXIX, 2000, pp. 123–135.
 "Jabadao" d'Anne de Tourville: la genèse d'un roman authentiquement breton, Revue française n°12, December 2001, pp. 55–68.

External links 
 Mer et Littérature, quand un bateau porte le nom d'un livre

20th-century French women writers
20th-century French non-fiction writers
Prix Femina winners
Writers from Brittany
People from Ille-et-Vilaine
1910 births
2004 deaths